After Your Own Heart is a 1921 American silent Western film directed by George Marshall and starring Tom Mix, Ora Carew and George Hernandez.

Cast
 Tom Mix as Herbert Parker
 Ora Carew as Loretta Bramley
 George Hernandez as Luke Bramley
 William Buckley as Peter Ruddock
 Sid Jordan as Tex Marole

References

Bibliography
 Connelly, Robert B. The Silents: Silent Feature Films, 1910-36, Volume 40, Issue 2. December Press, 1998.
 Munden, Kenneth White. The American Film Institute Catalog of Motion Pictures Produced in the United States, Part 1. University of California Press, 1997.

External links
 

1921 films
1921 Western (genre) films
American silent feature films
Silent American Western (genre) films
American black-and-white films
1920s English-language films
Films directed by George Marshall
Fox Film films
1920s American films